Notable people with the surname Garg include:
 Alice Garg (born 1942), Indian educator, activist and founder of NGO BAl Rashmi society
 Ankit Garg, Indian police superintendent
 Anu Garg  (born 1967), American author and speaker
 Balwant Gargi (1916-2003), Punjabi-language writer, theater director, and academic, who used the name Gargi as a self-adopted variation of Garg.
 Heiner Garg (born 1966), German politician (FDP)
 Mridula Garg (born 1938), Indian writer
 Neil Garg, American chemist
 Pushpendra Kumar Garg (born 1963), Indian sportsperson in yachting
 Rajinder Garg (born 1966), Indian politician
 Ramesh Garg, dean of student and alumni affairs in IIT Ropar
 Sugandha Garg (born 1982), Indian film actress, singer and television host
 V. K. Garg, Indian education administrator working as Dean in CUPB
 Vishal Garg, Indian researcher in IT in building science
 Vishal Garg (businessman), Indian-American entrepreneur
 Zubeen Garg (born 1972), Indian singer, music director, composer, songwriter and actor

See also
 The Garg (disambiguation)
 Gargantua (disambiguation)

Indian surnames